Teddy Hughes may refer to:

Teddy Hughes, As the World Turns character played by Kerr Smith
Teddy Hughes, in 1919–20 Manchester City F.C. season

See also
Ted Hughes (disambiguation)